Sacrifice is the fifth album by American composer Bill Laswell to be issued under the moniker Divination. It was released on October 13, 1998 by Meta Records.

Track listing

Personnel 
Adapted from the Sacrifice liner notes.

Laraaji – electric zither
Bill Laswell – bass guitar, effects, producer
Brijbass – cover art
Michael Fossenkemper – mastering
Robert Musso – engineering

Release history

References

External links 
 
 Sacrifice at Bandcamp

1998 albums
Bill Laswell albums
Albums produced by Bill Laswell